October 28 - Eastern Orthodox liturgical calendar - October 30

All fixed commemorations below are observed on November 11 by Eastern Orthodox Churches on the Old Calendar.

For October 29th, Orthodox Churches on the Old Calendar commemorate the Saints listed on October 16.

Saints
 Virgin Martyr Anastasia the Roman (258)  (see also: October 28 - West)
 Martyrs Claudius, Asterius, Neon, and Theonilla, of Aegae in Cilicia (285)  (see also: October 30)
 Martyr Sabbas Stratelates.
 Martyrs Cyril, Menas, and Menaeus, by the sword.
 Venerable Abramius the Recluse (360) and his niece St. Mary of Mesopotamia (397)
 Martyr Melitene of Marcionopolis, by beheading.
 Venerable Anna of Mt. Olympus in Bithynia, known as "Euphemianus" (826)
 Saint Serapion of Zarzma monastery, Georgia (900)
 Martyr Vassa.
 Saint Diomedes of Lefkosia.

Pre-Schism Western saints
 Saint Eusebia, a virgin-martyr in Bergamo in Italy and niece of St Domnio, martyred under Maximian Herculeus (late 3rd century)
 Martyrs Hyacinth, Quintus, Felician and Lucius, at Lucania in the south of Italy.
 Saint Kennera (Cinnera, Cannera), an anchoress in Kirk-Kinner in Galloway in Scotland (4th century)
 Saint Terence of Metz, sixteenth Bishop of Metz in the east of France (520)
 Saint Theodore (Theudar), a priest and disciple of St Caesarius of Arles, also abbot of one of the monasteries of Vienne in France (c. 575)
 Venerable Ermelinda (Ermelindis), Anchoress in Meldaert, Belgium (c. 595)
 Saint Colman of Kilmacduagh, a hermit in Arranmore and Burren in Co. Clare, founder of the monastery of Kilmacduagh (c. 632)
 Saint Bond (Baldus), born in Spain, he became a hermit in Sens in France (7th century)
 Saint Sigolinus (Sighelm), abbot of Stavelot and Malmédy in Belgium (c. 670)
 Saint John of Autun, a Bishop venerated in Autun, Confessor.
 Saint Stephen of Cajazzo, Abbot of San Salvatore Maggiore, and Bishop of Cajazzo (1023)

Post-Schism Orthodox saints
 Venerable Abramius of Rostov, Archimandrite, Wonderworker (1073)
 Venerable Abramius, recluse of the Kiev Near Caves (14th century)
 New Martyr Athanasius of Sparta, at Mudanya (1653) 
 Martyr Timothy of Esphigmenou Monastery, Mt. Athos, at Adrianople (1820)

New martyrs and confessors
 New Hieromartyrs Nicholas Probatov, priest (1918), and with him:
 Cosma, Victor Krasnov, Naum, Philip, John, Paul, Andrew, Paul, Basil, Alexis, John and Virgin-martyr Agatha (1918)
 New Hieromartyr John Rudinsky, priest (1930)
 New Hieromartyr Eugene Ivashko, priest (1937)
 Virgin-martyr Anastasia Lebedev (after 1937)
 New Hieromartyr Leonid Muravev, Priest (1941)

Other commemorations
 Commemoration of the deposition of the Honorable Head of the Holy Glorious Prophet, Forerunner and Baptist John.
 Glorification (1994) of Equal-to-the-Apostles Rostislav, Prince of Greater Moravia, Czechoslovakia (870)  (see also: May 11)

Icon gallery

Notes

References

Sources
 October 29/November 11. Orthodox Calendar (PRAVOSLAVIE.RU).
 November 11 / October 29. HOLY TRINITY RUSSIAN ORTHODOX CHURCH (A parish of the Patriarchate of Moscow).
 October 29. OCA - The Lives of the Saints.
 The Autonomous Orthodox Metropolia of Western Europe and the Americas (ROCOR). St. Hilarion Calendar of Saints for the year of our Lord 2004. St. Hilarion Press (Austin, TX). p. 81.
 The Twenty-Ninth Day of the Month of October. Orthodoxy in China.
 October 29. Latin Saints of the Orthodox Patriarchate of Rome.
 The Roman Martyrology. Transl. by the Archbishop of Baltimore. Last Edition, According to the Copy Printed at Rome in 1914. Revised Edition, with the Imprimatur of His Eminence Cardinal Gibbons. Baltimore: John Murphy Company, 1916. p. 333.
 Rev. Richard Stanton. A Menology of England and Wales, or, Brief Memorials of the Ancient British and English Saints Arranged According to the Calendar, Together with the Martyrs of the 16th and 17th Centuries. London: Burns & Oates, 1892. pp. 517–518.
Greek Sources
 Great Synaxaristes:  29 ΟΚΤΩΒΡΙΟΥ. ΜΕΓΑΣ ΣΥΝΑΞΑΡΙΣΤΗΣ.
  Συναξαριστής. 29 Οκτωβρίου. ECCLESIA.GR. (H ΕΚΚΛΗΣΙΑ ΤΗΣ ΕΛΛΑΔΟΣ).
  29/10/2015. Ορθόδοξος Συναξαριστής. 
Russian Sources
  11 ноября (29 октября). Православная Энциклопедия под редакцией Патриарха Московского и всея Руси Кирилла (электронная версия). (Orthodox Encyclopedia - Pravenc.ru).
  29 октября по старому стилю  /  11 ноября по новому стилю. Русская Православная Церковь - Православный церковный календарь на 2015 год.

October in the Eastern Orthodox calendar